The Islamic Dawa Party, also known as the Islamic Call Party, is a Shia Islamist political party in Iraq. Dawa and the Supreme Islamic Iraqi Council are two of the main parties in the religious-Shiite United Iraqi Alliance, which won a plurality of seats in both the provisional January 2005 Iraqi election and the longer-term December 2005 election. The party is led by Haider al-Abadi, who was the Prime Minister of Iraq from 8 September 2014 to 25 October 2018. The party backed the Iranian Revolution and also Ayatollah Ruhollah Khomeini during the Iran–Iraq War and the group still receives financial support from Tehran despite ideological differences with the Islamic Republic.  As of 2019, after two decades of political prominence and success, it is suffering from  internal divisions and on danger of losing its "political relevance".

History
The Dawa movement coalesced in the years around 1960 in Shia holy cities in southern Iraq. At the time, its primary goal was to counterbalance the intellectual hold that Marxism and other secular ideologies had on Iraqi Shia. Seminarian Mohammad Baqir al-Sadr quickly emerged as its leading figure and wrote its manifesto, al-Usus, probably in 1960. The group argued for the creation of an Islamic polity and a modern political movement, with a disciplined, cell-based structure inspired by Leninist organizational ideas, to propagate its beliefs. It defined its mission as to "establish an Islamic government and install a ruling apparatus until favorable conditions arise to enable the nation to give its opinion in a referendum.". Party leaders and scholars have given different dates for the foundation of the movement, with estimates ranging from 1957 through the late 1960s. They also differ on when it adopted its name, when it started to be considered a party, and in which city - Najaf, or Karbala - it was founded.

A twin party was also founded in Lebanon by clerics who had studied in Najaf and supported Muhammad Baqr al-Sadr's vision of a resurgent Islam.

Hizb Al-Dawa gained strength in the 1970s recruiting from among the Shi'a ulama and youth. During the 1970s, the government shut down the Shi'a journal Risalat al-Islam and closed several religious educational institutions. The government passed a law obligating Iraqi students of the hawza to undertake national military service. The Ba'athists then began specifically targeting Al-Dawa members, arresting and imprisoning them from 1972 onwards. In 1973, someone killed the alleged head of Al-Dawa's Baghdad branch in prison. In 1974, 75 Al-Dawa members were arrested and sentenced to death by the Ba'athist revolutionary court. In 1975, the government canceled the annual procession from Najaf to Karbala, known as marad al-ras. Although subject to repressive measures throughout the 1970s, large-scale opposition to the government by Al-Dawa goes back to the Safar Intifada of February 1977. Despite the government's ban on the celebration of marad al-ras, Al-Dawa organized the procession in 1977. They were subsequently attacked by police. After this period it also interacted with the Ayatollah Ruhollah Khomeini, the future dictator of Iran, during his exile in Najaf in Iraq. Widely viewed in the West as a terrorist organization at the time, the Dawa party was banned in 1980 and its members sentenced to death in absentia by the Iraqi Revolutionary Command Council.

Iranian Islamic Revolution and US Embassy Bombing
Dawa supported the Islamic Revolution in Iran and in turn received support from the Iranian government. During the Iran–Iraq War, Iran backed a Dawa insurgency against Saddam Hussein's Ba'athist government in Iraq. In 1979, Dawa moved its headquarters to Tehran, the capital of Iran. It bombed the Iraqi Embassy in Beirut in December 1981, the first of its international attacks. Dawa party was thought to have been behind the bombing of the US embassy in Kuwait as well as other installations as punishment of Kuwait, America and France's military and financial assistance to Iraq in its war against Iran (see 1983 Kuwait bombings). One of those convicted for the bombing was Jamal Jafaar Mohammed, a member of Iraq's parliament and military commander of the Popular Mobilization Forces.

Despite this cooperation, al-Sadr's and Khomeini's visions of an Islamic Republic differed sharply in certain respects.  While Khomeini argued the power of the state should rest with the ulema, Al-Dawa supported the notion of power resting with the ummah, or in other words, the people. This disagreement was one factor that led to the formation of SCIRI as a separate group from Al-Dawa. Al-Dawa claimed to have many Sunni members in the 1980s and coordinated with several Sunni Islamist groups at that stage. On 31 March 1980, the Ba'athist regime's Revolutionary Command Council passed a law sentencing to death all past and present members of the Dawa party, its affiliated organizations, and people working for its goals. This was soon followed by a renewed and relentless purge of alleged and actual party members, with estimates varying on the numbers executed due to the secretive nature of the Iraqi regime.

In the West, Al-Dawa was widely viewed as a terrorist organization during the Iran–Iraq War, especially since the West tended to be more supportive of Iraq during that conflict. It is thought responsible for a host of assassination attempts in Iraq against the president, prime minister and others, as well as attacks against  Western and Sunni targets elsewhere. It attempted to assassinate Tariq Aziz, Hussein's longtime loyalist, in 1980; and Saddam Hussein himself in 1982 and 1987. Following Saddam's 2003 overthrow, the former president was ultimately hanged for the Dujail Massacre, the judicial reprisals and torture carried out following a Dawa assassination attempt on himself in 1982.

Dawa versus Muhammad Baqir al-Sadr in the '80s
Tensions between Al-Sadr and Dawa came to light when Al-Sadr forbade his students at the seminary (Hawza) from joining the Dawa party. Amongst the retaliatory steps taken, Dawa switched their allegiance to Abu Al-Qassim Al-Khoei another leading scholar in Najaf.

1990s
After the Persian Gulf War, the interests of Al-Dawa and the United States became more closely aligned.  The efforts of Al-Dawa representatives and other opponents of Saddam Hussein led to the founding of the Iraqi National Congress, which relied heavily on United States funding. INC's political platform promised "human rights and rule of law within a constitutional, democratic, and pluralistic Iraq".  The Dawa Party itself participated in the congress between 1992 and 1995, withdrawing because of disagreements with Kurdish parties over how Iraq should be governed after Hussein's eventual ouster.

2003 American invasion
Most leaders of Al-Dawa remained in exile in Iran and elsewhere until the American invasion of Iraq in 2003.  During this period, some of its factions moved to SCIRI. Al-Dawa Party, in contrast to the other Shia Islamic Iraqi opposition parties, took a stance against the war. Ibrahim al-Jaafari was personally involved in ensuring that Al-Dawa participated in anti-war protests across the UK in the run-up to the 2003 Iraq war. After the invasion, both Al-Dawa and SCIRI returned to Iraq. Al-Dawa chose Nasariyah as its base of operations in Iraq and now essentially controls this city.

Recent development 

The Iraqi Islamic Dawa Party re-elected Nouri al-Maliki, Prime Minister of Iraq between 2006 and 2014,  as its secretary-general in July 2019.

According to Harith Hassan of the Carnegie Middle East Center, Islamic Dawa was Iraq's leading party from 2003 to 2018, but during this time "its commitment to building an Islamic state waned and its priorities were shaped increasingly by the challenges of governance and the pursuit of clientelist politics". It has felt compelled to focus on ethnosectarian (Shia) identity, political patronage, and the division of petroleum export spoils to win support, instead of selling its ideology and political programs to voters. As of 2019, it has become "divided by internal factions" and lost its "political relevance".

Ideology
The political ideology of Al-Dawa is heavily influenced by work done by Baqr al-Sadr, who laid out four mandatory principles of governance in his 1975 work, Islamic Political System. These are:

 Absolute sovereignty belongs to God.
 Islamic injunctions are the basis of legislation. The legislative authority may enact any law not repugnant to Islam.
The people, as vice-regents of Allah, are entrusted with legislative and executive powers.
 The jurist holding religious authority represents Islam. By confirming legislative and executive actions, he gives them legality.

In his Islamic political system, Sadr sought "a balance" between the two forces of  "consultation" (shura, the role of "the people") and the oversight role of the ‘ulama, specifically "the jurist holding religious authority represents Islam". He thought that political control should be 

Upon joining the party, allegiance must be sworn to the party.

Timeline
 1968–1969: Al-Dawa founded by Muhammad Baqir al-Sadr in response to repression of Shi'i religious academies in Najaf by the Iraqi Ba'ath regime.
 1974: Ba'athist revolutionary court arrests and sentences 75 Al-Dawa members to death.
 1975: Annual pilgrimage from Najaf to Karbala – called the Marad al-Ras – is cancelled by the Ba'ath government.
 1977 February: The Safar Intifada. Al-Dawa organizes Marad al-Ras, in spite of government ban. Event is attacked by police.
 1979: Iranian Revolution. Al-Dawa creates a military wing, later called Shahid al-Sadr.
 1980 30 March: Ba'athist Revolutionary Command Council retroactively bans Al-Dawa; membership was made punishable by death. 96 Al-Dawa members are allegedly executed this month.
 1980 1 April: Al-Dawa unsuccessfully attempts to assassinate Tariq Aziz, Foreign Minister at the time.
 1980 9 April: Ayatollah Muhammad Baqir al-Sadr and his sister Amina Sadr bint al-Huda are arrested and executed.
 1981 Mid-December: Iraqi embassy in Beirut is leveled by a suicide bomber. Iraqi Al-Dawa party claims credit for the attack, citing Iraq's invasion of Iran. Perhaps the first Shia suicide bombing, the attack was an "oft-noticed precedent" for the 1983 bombing of the American Embassy and Marine barracks in Beirut.
 1982: Al-Dawa assassination attempt on Saddam Hussein in Dujail fails. Heavy crack-downs on Al-Dawa by Hussein's regime follow, leading to the Dujail Massacre. Many flee to Iran, where it suffers from competition with SCIRI.
 1983 12 December: In Kuwait, the American and French embassies, Kuwait airport, the main oil refinery in Kuwait, and a residential area for Raytheon employees are bombed. 17 suspects were soon arrested, mostly Al-Dawa members, including Jamal Jafaar Mohammed (currently member of Iraq's parliament as a member of Prime Minister Nuri al-Maliki's ruling coalition). Jamal Jafaar Mohammed escapes from Kuwait before the trial starts and is sentenced to death in absentia in 1984.
 1987: Al-Dawa attacks Saddam's motorcade but again fails to kill him.
 1996: Attempt made on the life of Saddam's son, Uday. Al-Dawa blamed.
 2003: After the Invasion of Iraq Al-Dawa returns to Iraq, basing itself in the city of Nasiriya which the party now runs and controls.
 2005 January: The United Iraqi Alliance, triumphs in the January 2005 Elections; Dawa leader Ibrahim al-Jaafari becomes Prime Minister.
 2005 December: The United Iraqi Alliance, triumphs in the December 2005 Elections.
 2006: Al-Dawa deputy leader Nouri al-Maliki replaces Ibrahim al-Jaafari as Prime Minister.

Transliterations
 Dawa
 Da'wa
 Daawa

References

External links

 
1957 establishments in Iraq
Anti-Zionism in Iraq
Anti-Zionist political parties
Formerly banned Islamist parties
Formerly banned political parties in Iraq
Iran–Iraq relations
Islamic democratic political parties
Islamic political parties in Iraq
Organizations of the 1991 uprisings in Iraq
Organizations of the Arab Spring
Political parties established in 1957
Political parties in Iraq
Rebel groups in Iraq
Shia Islam in Iraq
Shia Islamic political parties
Jihadist groups in Iraq
Resistance movements
Arab militant groups
Shia Islamist groups
Pro-government factions of the Syrian civil war